Thalaina is a genus of moths in the family Geometridae first described by Francis Walker in 1855.

Species
Species include:
 Thalaina clara Walker, 1855
 Thalaina selenaea Doubleday, 1845

References

Nacophorini
Geometridae genera